Reial Club Deportiu Espanyol de Barcelona "B" is the reserve team of the RCD Espanyol, club based in Barcelona, in the autonomous community of Catalonia. The team was founded in 1991 and plays in the Segunda Federación – Group 3, holding home matches at the 3,000-seat capacity Ciutat Esportiva Dani Jarque.

Unlike the English League, reserve teams in Spain play in the same football pyramid as their senior team rather than a separate league. However, reserve teams cannot play in the same division as their senior team and are no longer able  to compete in the Copa del Rey.

History
In 1981, the Futbol Club Cristinenc was created in Santa Cristina d'Aro, Province of Girona. The club had a speedy progression through the lower divisions until it reached the fourth division. It had also become a feeder club for the RCD Español.

In 1991 the team changed its denomination to the Cristinenc-Espanyol, being renamed the Real Club Deportivo Espanyol B three years later, while also gaining reserve team status for Espanyol. It fluctuated between the fourth and the third levels in the following decades, the longest spell being five years, with a second position in the 2001–02 season. The Catalan outfit  failed to promote during the team's three visits to the playoffs.

In the 2009–10 Espanyol B finished in 16th position, above the relegation zone, and dropped down a division in the relegation playoffs.

Season to season
As FC Cristinenc

As RCD Espanyol's reserve team

20 seasons in Segunda División B
2 seasons in Segunda Federación
12 seasons in Tercera División
7 seasons in Categorías Regionales

Honours
Tercera División: 1994–95, 2008–09, 2017–18

Players

Current squad
.

From Youth Academy

Out on loan

Current technical staff

Notable players

Note: This list includes players that have appeared in at least 100 top league games and/or have reached international status.

  Ildefons Lima
  Kévin Soni
  Azrack Mahamat
  Thievy Bifouma
  Hérita Ilunga
  Juvenal Edjogo-Owono
  Jacinto Elá
  Jordan Gutiérrez
  Bacari
  Jordi Tarrés
  Arthur Irawan
  Eric Bailly
  Zouhair Feddal
  Marvin Zeegelaar
  Kalu Uche
  Rui Fonte
  Jordi Amat
  Raúl Baena
  Alberto de la Bella
  Marc Bertrán
  Joan Capdevila
  Kiko Casilla
  Javi Chica
  Carlos Clerc
  Ferran Coro
  Albert Crusat
  Sergi Darder
  Rubén Duarte
  David García
  Jordi Gómez
  Sergio González
  Moisés Hurtado
  Gorka Iraizoz
  Daniel Jarque
  Joan Jordán
  Pol Lirola
  David López
  Javi López
  Pau López
  Alberto Lopo
  Quique de Lucas
  Pablo Maffeo
  Javi Márquez
  Aarón Martín
  Óscar Melendo
  Ángel Morales
  Javi Puado
  Marc Roca
  Víctor Ruiz
  Bruno Saltor
  Sergio Sánchez
  Antonio Soldevilla
  Raúl Tamudo
  Cristian Tello
  Marc Torrejón
  Álvaro Vázquez
  Dídac Vilà

References

External links

Espanyol official website
Futbolme team profile 

RCD Espanyol
Spanish reserve football teams
Football clubs in Barcelona
Association football clubs established in 1981
1981 establishments in Spain